Érnest-Lottin Ebongué (born May 15, 1962 in Yaoundé) is a Cameroonian former professional footballer who played as a forward. He was capped eight times for the Cameroonian national team, scoring once  and was part of the team for the 1982 World Cup, playing in all three matches.

References

Living people
1962 births
Footballers from Yaoundé
Cameroonian footballers
Cameroonian expatriate footballers
Cameroon international footballers
Cameroon under-20 international footballers
Association football forwards
Ligue 2 players
Primeira Liga players
Tonnerre Yaoundé players
AS Béziers Hérault (football) players
USF Fécamp players
Vitória S.C. players
Varzim S.C. players
C.D. Aves players
S.C. Lamego players
1982 FIFA World Cup players
1982 African Cup of Nations players
1984 African Cup of Nations players
1986 African Cup of Nations players
1990 African Cup of Nations players
1992 African Cup of Nations players
Africa Cup of Nations-winning players
Olympic footballers of Cameroon
Footballers at the 1984 Summer Olympics
Expatriate footballers in France
Expatriate footballers in Portugal
Expatriate footballers in Indonesia
Expatriate footballers in Austria
Cameroonian expatriate sportspeople in France
Cameroonian expatriate sportspeople in Portugal
Cameroonian expatriate sportspeople in Indonesia
Cameroonian expatriate sportspeople in Austria